Lampros Georgiadis (born 11 January 1963) is a Greek former professional footballer who played as midfielder.

Club career
Georgiadis initially competed in the village team, AE Nea Sampsounta and then PAS Preveza where he played for 4 years at Gamma Ethniki. In 1984 he was transferred to another Gamma Ethniki side, Anagennisi Arta for 5 million drachmas.

In 1984 Georgiadis made his big move and was transferred to AEK Athens, while he was serving in the Army, for 12 millon drachmas. He played as am attacking midfielder and left midfielder, but many times he also played as a left back. A footballer with a long stride and a strong shot, he was an important player of the team for the seven years he wore its jersey, having appearances sometimes as a starter and sometimes as a substitute. He did not impress with his performances, while also having several injuries, but he was a player who won the trust of his coaches. He had a fairly large participation in the championship of 1989, while on the contrary in his last 2 seasons in the team when they won the respective titles, his participation was very little. In addition to these 3 championships, he won the one Super Cup and one League Cup with AEK. He left in the summer of 1993 and before ending his career he also played for the Kalamata.

After football
After the end of his football career, he did not work professionally in the field of football. However, he has a strong participation in events and matches of the association of veteran football players of AEK Athens. In 2018 he was hired as a coach in the football academies of Kostas Nestoridis, Nestoras FC.

Honours

AEK Athens 
Alpha Ethniki: 1988–89, 1991–92, 1992–93
Greek Super Cup: 1989
Greek League Cup: 1990

References

1963 births
Living people
Greek footballers
Super League Greece players
Anagennisi Arta F.C. players
AEK Athens F.C. players
Kalamata F.C. players
Association football midfielders
People from Preveza (regional unit)